Negative edge (or variations) may refer to:

 A Signal edge when a signal goes high or low
 An alternative name for a swimming pool technology, Infinity pool 
 Negative edge, the name for a concept in fighting game theory for games such as Street Fighter II, wherein a special move is made easier to execute by allowing the player to execute such a move by using a joystick command followed by the release of a previously depressed pushbutton.